The first election to the Glamorgan County Council was held on 17 January 1889. Results were announced over several days.  They were followed by the 1892 election. The authority, by far the largest county in Wales in terms of population,  was established by the 1888 Local Government Act. The county of Glamorgan was at this time becoming heavily industrialised although some areas such as the Vale of Glamorgan remained essentially rural.

Overview of the Result
The rise of nonconformist liberalism, especially since the 1860s, throughout Wales, had challenged the prevailing influence of the landed gentry. However, even in 1889, the traditional forces remained influential and no working men were elected to the Council. For many weeks prior to the election there was lively campaigning in most wards and on election day, 'there was great interest manifested in the proceedings, and at most of the polling places  a great many votes were recorded.'

As in most parts of Wales, the Liberal Party was triumphant and won a majority of the seats. The Liberal members elected ranged however, from traditional landowners such as Henry Hussey Vivian, through indigenous coalowners such as F.L. Davis to nonconformist radicals like the Rev Aaron Davies, Pontlottyn. A vigorous campaign was fought by the Liberals, which was reported in detail in the local press.

The following is a summary of the council composition following the election. The figures shown are the number of councillors plus aldermen. For instance 13 + 2 indicates 13 councillors and 2 aldermen.

|}

Candidates and unopposed returns
66 members were returned to the Council. There were 6 wards that returned two members while the other 54 wards returned one member only.

Most wards were contested by Liberal and Conservative candidates, although several of the latter stood as Independents. In many cases, Liberals fought each other.

There were only three unopposed returns, all of whom were Liberals. Frederick Lewis Davis, defeated by Mabon at the Rhondda election in 1885 was returned unopposed in Ferndale as was W.H. Mathias at another Rhondda ward. The third unopposed return was David Davies in Morriston.

Contested elections

Most candidates were described as either Liberals or Conservatives but these allegiances were fluid and, in some cases, there was little evidence of a connection between candidates and local Liberal or Conservative party organisations.

Aberdare and Merthyr Districts

There were five seats in the Aberdare district, namely Aberaman, Aberdare Town, Gadlys, Hirwaun and Llwydcoed and the return of  three Conservatives in this predominantly radical and working-class community excited some comment. The three Conservatives, Sir William Thomas Lewis, Rees Hopkin Rhys and James Lewis, had all been active in the public life of the valley for many years, and their return owed as much to their local influence as to their politics. The nominally Liberal local paper, the Aberdare Times, regretted that the local Liberal Association chose to run candidates against these prominent local figures. Upon the return of all three, a demonstration was held where (according to the admittedly anti-Liberal Aberdare Times), 'all classes of the people united to mark their sense of the pronounced triumph over the clique who presume to act in the name of the Liberal Association.'

In the Merthyr Tydfil area, however, Liberal candidates were more successful but here too the Conservatives performed strongly.

Rhondda District

In the Rhondda district the success of William Abraham (Mabon) at the 1885 General Election had led to the emergence of a Rhondda Liberal and Labour Association within which working class leaders were active.  At the 1889 election the Association advanced a slate of ten candidates, nine of whom were successful. this level of organisation contrasted sharply with other parts of the county. It is also significant that most of the official Liberal candidates had supported the official Liberal candidate, Frederick Davis, in 1885, rather than the Lib-Lab Mabon. The relative unity of the valley Liberals in these elections is illustrated by a meeting held at the Treorchy Board Schools to support the candidatures of William Morgan and J.S. Edwards at Treherbert and Treorchy respectively. The meeting was chaired by William Morris, minister of Noddfa, Treorchy and addressed by both Daronwy Isaac and Mabon himself.

The New Council
The first meeting of the Council was held at the Gwyn Hall in Neath and Sir Hussey Vivian MP elected to the chair. The Liberal group did agree on a list of aldermen before hand but they were not as cohesive as in other counties in using a block vote.

One of the main debates related to the venue for meetings, with the claims of Neath and Pontypridd being most prominent. The Bridgend Local Board of Health had petitioned Lord Dunraven to lobby for that town to be considered.

Results

Aberaman
This contest was widely reported and was a significant victory for a local tradesman, T.P. White, over a leading colliery official who later became a prominent figure in the South Wales and Monmouthshire Coalowners' Association. White had been chosen as Liberal candidate after a public meeting at Saron Chapel, Aberaman. In a letter to the press he referred to pressure from colliery officials and sought to re-assure the electors that there was a secret ballot.

Aberavon

Aberdare Town

Barry and Cadoxton

Bridgend

Briton Ferry

Caeharris
E.P. Martin was regarded as the candidate of the Dowlais Iron Company and was said to have dominated the contest from the outset.

Caerphilly

Coedffranc

Coity

Cowbridge

Cwmavon

Cyfarthfa

Cymmer
Henry Naunton Davies was opposed by T. Griffiths, manager of Cymmer Colliery and a member of the Ystradyfodwg Local Board.

Dinas Powys

Dowlais

Dulais Valley
Evans Bevan, owner of the anthracite colliery at Seven Sisters, was a prominent businessman and industrialist. His return reflected his social status in the recently developed Dulais Valley.

Ferndale

Gadlys
James Lewis had been active in the public life of the Aberdare Valley for many years and his candidacy was supported by many Liberals, even though his politics were regarded as Conservative.

Garw Valley

Gellifaelog

Gelligaer

Gower

Hirwaun
The contest was marked by accusations (originally made at the time of the Glamorgan county election of 1880) that Lewis, as a prominent coal owner and land agent, had refused requests by nonconformists for land to build chapels. He publicly refuted these allegations, at a meeting held at Ebenezer, Trecynon.  Lewis's supporters also countered these claims by publishing old correspondence, including a letter by the late Thomas Price which refuted the accusations. There is evidence that Lewis's personal popularity transcended any political considerations.

Kibbor

Llandaff

Llandeilo Talybont

Llansamlet

Llantrisant

Llantwit Fardre
This large ward covered the parishes of Llantwit Fardre, Llanfabon and Llanwonno and witnessed a close contest. The Liberal candidate, Edward Edwards, addressing a public meeting at Graigberthlwyd Chapel, referred to personal attacks made against him by opponents and defended his record as a Guardian and member of the Gelligaer Highways Board. Dewi Mabon also addressed this meeting, and in response to questions, Edwards declared himself in favour of the Welsh language being taught more widely in schools. it was alleged that his opponent, Jabez Evans, though nominally an Independent, was supported by the Conservative Party.  This is borne out to some extent by reports of Evans's meetings, where he was generally supported by those who argued that the "best men" should be elected, regardless of their politics.

Llwydcoed

Llwynypia and Trealaw (two seats)
Lewis and Williams, chosen as the official candidates of the Liberal Association, faced one of the few prominent coal owners in the Rhondda to stand as a Conservative candidate. Their campaign was supported by D.A. Thomas who addressed a public meeting at Clydach Vale. Thomas stated that he had known Hood longer than the two Liberals, but that the county elections should be fought on political lines.

Loughor and Penderry

Maesteg

Margam

Merthyr Town
Following a close three-way contest, John Jenkins, a member of the Local Board of Health for twelve years, scored a narrow victory. Jenkins was the proprietor of the Thomastown Brickworks and a prominent figure in the Merthyr Building Society. Jenkins was said to have campaigned as a Radical, while the other two candidates relied upon their 'personal qualifications'. A few later, however, Jenkins was killed in an accident.

Merthyr Vale

Morriston
David Davis, a tinplate manufacturer, was returned unopposed. The widespread support he attracted was indicated by a meeting at Morriston, chaired by William Williams, Maesygwernen, 'who was supported by nearly all the tinplate manufacturers of the neighbourhood and the leading inhabitants of the district'.

Neath (two seats)

Newcastle

Ogmore

Ogmore Valley

Oystermouth

Penarth (two members)

Penrhiwceiber and Dyffryn (two seats)

Pentre and Ystrad (two seats)
David Evans, manager of David Davis & Sons' pit at Bodringallt, and former chairman of the Ystradyfodwg School Board 
was the only official Rhondda Labour and Liberal Association candidate to be defeated. The successful candidate was William Jenkins of Ystradefechan.

Penydarren

Plymouth

Pontardawe

Pontlottyn

Pontypridd
This contrast attracted considerable interest as a prominent Liberal faced a major employer in Pontypridd and owner of the Brown Lenox chain works.

Porth

Resolven

Sketty
John Powell's candidature was supported by key Liberal figures in the county, including Sir Hussey Vivian and Mabon, both of whom addressed meetings. Powell claimed the support of both the Liberal Association and the Labour Party.

Swansea Valley

Tirdeunaw

Treforest

Treorchy and Treherbert (two seats)
The relative unity of the valley Liberals in these elections is illustrated by a meeting held at the Treorchy Board Schools to support the candidatures of William Morgan and J.S. Edwards at Treherbert and Treorchy respectively. The meeting was chaired by William Morris, minister of Noddfa, Treorchy and addressed by both Daronwy Isaac and Mabon himself. At the 1885 election Morgan had supported F.L. Davis while Edwards had supported Mabon.

Tylorstown and Ynyshir

Ystalyfera
At Ystalyfera there were two strong competing factions for the Liberal candidacy, each supporting John Beynon and James Williams respectively. After a lively arbitration meeting at Swansea, where three referees including David Randell MP and Thomas Phillips of Llanelli presided, Beynon was selected. However, a meeting of Williams's supporters resolved to ignore the decision and contest the seat.  These divisions may have contributed to the Conservative victory.

Election of Aldermen

In addition to the 66 councillors the council consisted of 22 county aldermen. Aldermen were elected by the council, and served a six-year term. Following the election of the initial 22 aldermen, half of the aldermanic bench would be  elected every three years following the triennial council election.

Prior to the elections there had been some discussion about the method of electing aldermen. At a meeting in Clydach Vale, D.A. Thomas had argued that although he believed the elections should be fought on political lines, men such as J. T. D. Llewellyn and Rees Hopkin Rhys should be selected as aldermen in order that the Council could benefit from their experience as magistrates. This had been contradicted by one of the two Liberal candidates for the ward who had declared that the aldermen should be elected from within the council. In the event both Llewelyn and Rhys were successful at the elections in any case.

After the initial elections, there were sixteen Aldermanic vacancies and the following Alderman were appointed by the newly elected council:

Elected for six years
J. T. D. Llewellyn, Conservative (elected councillor at Lougher and Penderry)
Thomas Williams, Liberal (elected councillor at Penydarren)
Walter H. Morgan Liberal (elected councillor at Pontypridd) 
William Hunter, Liberal (elected councillor at  Briton Ferry)
Frederick L. Davis, Liberal (elected councillor at Ferndale)
John Davies, Liberal  (elected councillor at Maesteg )
William Morgan  (elected councillor at Treherbert)
Dr H. Naunton Davies, Liberal (elected Councillor at Cymmer)
John Jones Griffiths, Liberal (elected councillor at Porth)
Gwilym James,  (elected councillor at Gellifaelog)
Sir William Thomas Lewis, Conservative (elected councillor at Hirwaun)

Elected for three years
Gwilym Jones, Liberal (elected councillor at Penrhiwceiber and Dyffryn)
John Cory, Liberal (elected councillor at  Barry and Cadoxton)
David Davies, Liberal (elected councillor at Morriston)
David Lewis  Liberal  (elected councillor at  Caerphilly)
Rev Aaron Davies, Liberal (elected councillor at Pontlottyn)
William Jenkins, Liberal (elected councillor at Pentre and Ystrad)
Thomas Rees, Liberal (elected councillor at Cowbridge)
Edward Plummer, Liberal (elected councillor at Resolven)
Rees Harries, Liberal (elected councillor at Llandeilo Talybont)
Thomas P. White, Liberal (elected councillor at Aberaman)
Richard Jenkins, Liberal (elected councillor at Aberavon )

In contrast to the position in some Welsh counties such as Cardiganshire, where the Liberal majority voted en bloc for a slate of candidates, including a small number of Conservatives, the distribution of the votes in the ballot suggested that this was not the case in Glamorgan. The votes ranged from 58 for J.T.D. Llewellyn to 25 for Sir William Thomas Lewis, who was only four votes ahead of the next candidate, Lord Aberdare.  The Liberal caucus did agree on a slate, and altered it when four members including Hussey Vivian and Cory Yeo, declined to be nominated. However, the Liberal group were not as disciplined in adhering to the list as in some rural counties, perhaps reflecting the ambiguity inherent in some councillors' political allegiances. Even so, the end result was that the Liberals had all but two of the aldermanic seats.

By-elections

Aberaman by -election
A by-election was held following T.P. White's elevation to the aldermanic bench. The result of the first election was regarded with surprise in some quarters and one local newspaper predicted that E.M. Hann, defeated at the first contest would be successful in the by-election. However, Hann was again defeated by a different Liberal candidate, Thomas Davies.

Aberavon by-election

Barry and Cadoxton by-election

Briton Ferry by-election

Caerphilly by-election

Cowbridge by-election

Cymmer by-election
Following the election of Henry Naunton Davies as alderman, his brother scored a decisive victory at the by-election.

Ferndale by-election
Evans, rejected at Pentre and Ystrad at the initial election, was returned unopposed.

Gellifaelog by-election

Hirwaun by-election
Morgan won the by-election, having been defeated at the initial contest by Sir William Thomas Lewis

Llandeilo Talybont by-election
Following the election of Rees Harries as alderman, a public meeting was held under his chairmanship at which Thomas Freeman was selected to contest the seat. There were no other nominations. Freeman was a prominent figure in the public life of Swansea and a member of the Swansea Town Council, which became the Swansea County Borough Council in 1889.

Loughor and Penderry by-election

Maesteg by-election

Morriston by-election

Penrhiwceiber and Dyffryn by-election

Pentre and Ystrad by-election
Following the election of William Jenkins as alderman, Aneurin Cule, a grocer from Pentre and David Thomas, checkweigher at Pentre Colliery were nominated but Cule withdrew allowing Thomas to be returned unopposed. Thomas thus became the first working man to be elected to Glamorgan County Council.

Penydarren by-election

Pontlottyn by-election

Pontypridd by-election

Porth by-election 
Following the election of John Jones Griffiths as alderman, two Liberals, including Hugh Jones, Baptist minister at Penygraig, were defeated by an Independent candidate.

Resolven by-election

Treorchy and Treherbert by-election
Following the election of William Morgan as alderman, Evan Davies, a Treherbert butcher and William Morris, minister of Noddfa, Treorchy were nominated but Morris withdrew allowing Davies to be returned unopposed.

By-Elections 1889-1892

Merthyr Town by-election 1889
The by-election arose following the death of the Liberal councillor, John Jenkins, a few weeks after the election. Frank James, who had been defeated by 33 votes at the original election in which both a Conservative and Unionist opposed the Liberal candidate, now scored a decisive victory.

Ferndale by-election 1890
A by-election took place at Ferndale on 1 January 1890 following the death of David Evans, Bodringallt.  The elected candidate was the nominee of the Rhondda Labour and Liberal Association.

References

Bibliography

1889
Glamorgan
19th century in Glamorgan